Choreveco (possibly from Aymara churi dull yellow, wiqu a corner in a house, a mountain cove) is a mountain in the Andes of southern Peru, about  high. It is located in the Tacna Region, Candarave Province, Candarave District, and in the Tarata Province, Susapaya District. Choreveco lies northeast of the volcano Yucamane. It is situated between the mountain Chiarjaque in the west and the lake Vilacota in the east.

References

Mountains of Peru
Mountains of Tacna Region